Ödipussi is a 1988 German comedy film, written and directed by and also starring Loriot. It was the first of two feature films he directed, the other one being Pappa Ante Portas. The title is a pun on the Oedipus complex described by Sigmund Freud and the nickname "Pussi", the way the main protagonist is called by his mother throughout the film. Rumors that the title might also be a reference to the James Bond film Octopussy have been denied by Loriot.

Synopsis
Paul Winkelmann runs the family's furniture and decoration business. Despite his age (he is 56 years old), he is still single and maintains a close relationship with his mother, who cooks for him and cannot understand that he now has his own apartment.

When he meets Margarethe Tietze, a practicing psychologist, the two attempt to join their expertise in order to improve on consulting potential furniture customers with psychological troubles. After an afternoon of coffee and pastries and a business trip to Italy, Margarethe finally introduces Paul to her parents, who initially assume he is a patient of hers. In the meantime, Paul's jealous mother found a sublessee - very much to the dislike of Paul. Margarethe's family's return visit at Paul's mother's apartment ends with a debacle, but Paul and Margarethe nevertheless start a relationship.

Premières in East and West Germany
The première of the movie was on March 10, 1988 at 16:00 in East Berlin and in the evening in the West. It was the first and only première in the divided Germany to happen in both parts of the country on the same day. In the Federal Republic the film was seen by 4,612,801 viewers.

References

External links 
 

1988 films
1988 comedy films
German comedy films
West German films
1980s German-language films
Films set in West Germany
Films set in Italy
Films produced by Horst Wendlandt
1980s German films